Jeff Madill (born June 21, 1965) is a Canadian former professional ice hockey right winger. He was drafted by the New Jersey Devils in the 1987 NHL Supplemental Draft, and played 14 games for them during the 1990–91 season. The rest of his career, which lasted from 1987 to 1997, was spent in the American Hockey League and International Hockey League.

Biography
Madill was born in Oshawa, Ontario. As a youth, he played in the 1978 Quebec International Pee-Wee Hockey Tournament with a minor ice hockey team from Oshawa.

After playing three seasons with the Ohio State Buckeyes, Madill made his professional debut with the Utica Devils of the American Hockey League in 1987–88.  Madill played four seasons with Utica before making his National Hockey League debut with New Jersey in 1990–91.  He played fourteen regular season and seven playoff games with the Devils that season. He also became the first Devil to score his first NHL goal in his debut game.

Madill played six seasons in the International Hockey League with seven different teams before retiring in 1998.

While serving as an assistant coach for the Kansas City Outlaws of the United Hockey League during the 2004–05 season, Madill suited up and played in the club's final game of the season. In that game, he showed why he'd been given the nickname "Mad Dog," amassing 21 penalty minutes in three shifts. He has a daughter and son.

Career statistics

Regular season and playoffs

Awards and honours

References

External links
 

1965 births
Living people
Atlanta Fire Ants players
Atlanta Knights players
Canadian ice hockey right wingers
Cincinnati Cyclones (IHL) players
Denver Grizzlies players
Ice hockey people from Ontario
Kansas City Blades players
Kansas City Outlaws players
Milwaukee Admirals (IHL) players
National Hockey League supplemental draft picks
New Jersey Devils draft picks
New Jersey Devils players
Ohio State Buckeyes men's ice hockey players
Phoenix Roadrunners (IHL) players
San Francisco Spiders players
Sportspeople from Oshawa
Utica Devils players